Dundalk entered the 2018 season as the League Cup holders from 2017, having won that competition and finished as runners-up in both league and FAI Cup. In January the club was taken over by United States-based investors, who had identified the club's European progress as a commercial opportunity. 2018 would turn out to be Stephen Kenny's sixth and final season as manager. He resigned one month after the end of the season to accept the Republic of Ireland U-21 manager's role, and was replaced by his assistant, Vinny Perth for 2019. The 2018 season was Dundalk's 10th consecutive season in the top tier of Irish football, their 83rd in all, and their 92nd in the League of Ireland.

Season summary
The new season's curtain raiser - the President's Cup - was played on 11 February in Oriel Park between Dundalk and Cork City - the winners of both league and cup the previous year. Cork City won on a 4-2 scoreline. The 36 round League programme commenced on 16 February 2018, and was completed on 26 October 2018. Dundalk regained their title with three games to spare, sealing the title in Oriel Park in a 1-1 draw with St Patrick's Athletic on 5 October 2018. They went on to win the 2018 FAI Cup with a 2-1 victory over Cork City in the final on 4 November 2018 - the club's fourth League and Cup Double. An opportunity to win the club's first domestic Treble was spurned when a largely reserve side lost the League Cup semi-final away to First Division Cobh Ramblers.

In Europe progress was limited when, after defeating Levadia Tallinn, and holding AEK Larnaca scoreless in Oriel Park, three quickfire first half goals in the away leg in Cyprus in the 2018-19 Europa League second qualifying round ended their interest in that year's competition.

First-Team Squad (2018)
Sources:

Competitions

President's Cup
Source:

Premier Division

FAI Cup
Source:
First Round

Second Round

Quarter Final

Semi Final

Final

League Cup
Source:
Second Round

Quarter Final

Semi Final

Leinster Senior Cup
Source:
Fourth Round

Quarter Final

Semi Final

Europe

Europa League
First qualifying round

Dundalk won 3–1 on aggregate.

Second qualifying round

AEK Larnaca won 4–0 on aggregate.

Awards

Player of the Month

PFAI Player of the Year

PFAI Young Player of the Year

FAI League of Ireland Player of the Year

SWAI Personality of the Year

Footnotes

References

Dundalk F.C. seasons
Dundalk